Zoltán Ebedli (born 26 October 1953) is an Hungarian retired  professional footballer who played as a midfielder. He was a member of the Hungarian national football team.

Career 
He is a home-grown player of Ferencvárosi TC. After Tibor Nyilasi, László Szokolai and László Pogány, he was the team's fourth highest scorer. He played one season for Újpest FC and then again for Ferencvárosi TC. At the end of his playing career, he first played for Erzsébeti Spartacus MTK LE, then for smaller Swedish team Syrianska FC until 1988.

National team 
Between 1976 and 1983 he played 12 times for the national team.

Achievements 

 Nemzeti Bajnokság I (NB I)
 Champion: 1975-76, 1980-81
 Magyar Kupa (MNK)
 Winner: 1974, 1976, 1978

References 

1953 births
Living people
Ferencvárosi TC footballers
Újpest FC players
Syrianska FC players
Hungarian footballers
Hungary international footballers
Association football midfielders
Nemzeti Bajnokság I players
Nemzeti Bajnokság III players
People from Budapest